Philip Rashleigh  (28 December 1729 – 26 June 1811) of Menabilly, Cornwall, was an antiquary and Fellow of the Royal Society and a Cornish squire.  He collected and published the Trewhiddle Hoard of Anglo-Saxon treasure, which still gives its name to the "Trewhiddle style" of 9th century decoration.

Origins
He was born at Aldermanbury, London, on 28 December 1729, the eldest son and heir of Jonathan Rashleigh (1693–1764), of Menabilly, MP for Fowey in Cornwall, by his wife Mary Clayton, daughter of Sir William Clayton, 1st Baronet (died 1744) of Marden in Surrey.

Career

He matriculated from New College, Oxford, 15 July 1749, and contributed to the poems of the university on the death of Frederick, Prince of Wales, a set of English verses, which is reprinted in Nichols's Select Collection of Poems (viii. 201–2); he left Oxford without taking a degree. On the death of his father in 1764 he inherited the family seat of Menabilly, near Fowey on the south coast of Cornwall.

He also took over from him in Parliament as the elected member for the family borough of Fowey on 21 January 1765, sitting continuously, in spite of contests and election petitions, until the dissolution of 1802, by which time he was known as the "Father of the House of Commons". His knowledge of Cornish mineralogy procured his election as a Fellow of the Society of Antiquaries and Fellow of the Royal Society in 1788.

Portrait
A portrait of Rashleigh, seated in a chair, was painted by John Opie about 1795, and is now in the Royal Cornwall Museum, Truro. It is a "fine specimen of the painter's best period".

Scientific work
Rashleigh's collection of minerals was remarkable for its various specimens of tin. Much is on display at the Royal Cornwall Museum, with portions at the Natural History Museum, and its most valuable portions are described in two volumes of Specimens of British Minerals from his cabinet (1797 and 1802). In the same collection are models in glass of the hailstones that fell on 20 October 1791, particulars of which, with the figured representations, are given, on Rashleigh's information, in King's Remarks on Stones fallen from the Clouds, pp. 18–20. He contributed antiquarian papers to the Archæologia, ix. 187–8, xi. 83–4, xii. 414, but they were derided by Dr. John Whitaker as the work of an "amateur in antiquarianism". A paper by him on certain "alluvial deposits" at Sandrycock, Cornwall, is in the Transactions of the Royal Geological Society of Cornwall, ii. 281–4, and a letter from him to E. M. Da Costa, on some English shells, is in the British Museum Addit. MS. 28541, f. 196. He constructed a remarkable grotto at Polridmouth, near the family seat.  Iin 1791 and 1792, Rashleigh sold 41 specimens from his collection to the Austrian collector Éléonore de Raab.

Marriage
He married his first cousin, Jane Pole (1720–1795), only daughter of the Rev. Carolus Pole, 3rd son of Sir John Pole of Shute, Devonshire. They had no issue, and the family estates passed to his nephew William Rashleigh (1777–1855), MP for Fowey (1812–18) and Sheriff of Cornwall for 1820.

Death and burial
He died at Menabilly on 26 June 1811 and was buried in the church of Tywardreath, Cornwall.

References

Attribution

External links
 Mineralogical Record gallery of illustration of the Rashleigh collection

1729 births
1811 deaths
Alumni of New College, Oxford
Mineralogists from Cornwall
Geologists from Cornwall
British antiquarians
Politicians from Cornwall
Fellows of the Royal Society
Fellows of the Society of Antiquaries of London
People from Fowey
Members of the Parliament of Great Britain for constituencies in Cornwall
British MPs 1761–1768
British MPs 1768–1774
British MPs 1774–1780
British MPs 1780–1784
British MPs 1784–1790
British MPs 1790–1796
British MPs 1796–1800
Members of the Parliament of the United Kingdom for constituencies in Cornwall
UK MPs 1801–1802
Philip
Burials in Cornwall